Joe Morris Doss (born March 29, 1943) served as the 10th bishop of the Episcopal Diocese of New Jersey from 1995 to 2001. He was elected bishop coadjutor in June 1993 and became bishop diocesan in 1995 following the retirement of G. P. Mellick Belshaw.

Biography 
Doss was born in Mobile, Alabama and graduated from Louisiana State University and General Theological Seminary; he also holds a J.D. from LSU. Prior to his election as bishop coadjutor, he was rector of St. Mark's Episcopal Church, Palo Alto, California since 1985, having held the same position at Grace Episcopal Church, New Orleans, Louisiana from 1973 to 1985 after being deacon-in-charge of the Episcopal Church of the Good Shepherd in Lake Charles, Louisiana.

Doss announced his resignation on March 12, 1999, with effect coming in place on September 30, 2001, after a tenure in which that diocese was led into the mainstream of the Episcopal Church, though not without conflict and controversy - much of which was aimed at Doss in personal accusations, none of which produced any evidence of wrongdoing. He has since written five books, in particular Let the Bastards Go: From Cuba to Freedom on "God's Mercy" and The Songs of the Mothers: Promises for the Future Church. Doss also wrote an award-winning play, Song of a Man Coming Through, together with his son, M. Andrew Doss, about a death row inmate he defended in 1984. In 1985, Doss was elected to the Common Cause National Governing Board. He holds a law degree from Louisiana State University.

Following his resignation, Doss moved with his wife to New Orleans, Louisiana.

References

Louisiana State University alumni
General Theological Seminary alumni
1943 births
Living people
People from Mobile, Alabama
Episcopal bishops of New Jersey